The 1946–47 Duke Blue Devils men's basketball team represented Duke University during the 1946–47 men's college basketball season. The head coach was Gerry Gerard, coaching his fifth season with the Blue Devils. The team finished with an overall record of 19–8.

References 

Duke Blue Devils men's basketball seasons
Duke
1946 in sports in North Carolina
1947 in sports in North Carolina